Alocasia chaii is a species of flowering plant in the family Araceae, native to Sarawak state, Malaysia. Occasionally cultivated for its coriaceous leaves that remain peltate even when mature, it is considered obscure even by Alocasia enthusiasts and is very rarely found in commerce.

References

chaii
Endemic flora of Borneo
Flora of Sarawak
Plants described in 2007